Dan Coyle (21 June 1913 – 26 November 1972) was an Irish athlete. He competed in the men's hammer throw at the 1948 Summer Olympics.

References

1913 births
1972 deaths
Athletes (track and field) at the 1948 Summer Olympics
Irish male hammer throwers
Olympic athletes of Ireland
Place of birth missing